Edith Margaret Dalziel  (21 November 1916 – 5 May 2003) was an English literature scholar at the University of Otago, Dunedin, New Zealand. She was the first female Pro-Vice Chancellor of the university.

Biography
Dalziel was born in Rangiora in 1916; her parents were Robert and Eva Dalziel. She received her education at Rangiora District School and Rangiora High School. She then completed a master of arts degree at Canterbury University College in 1937 and a doctoral degree at the University of Oxford in 1953. She joined the Department of English at the University of Otago the same year, and remained with the department until her retirement in 1981. On her promotion to professor in 1966 she became the first female professor in the department. In 1971 she was elected Dean of the Faculty of Arts; she was Pro-Vice Chancellor from 1975 to 1977; and Head of Department of English from 1978 to 1980.

During her tenure, Dalziel taught and mentored Bill Manhire, who went on to become a notable New Zealand poet.

Dalziel died in Dunedin on 5 May 2003. Her family remembers her as an indomitable champion of women's rights in academia and a trailblazer for academic leadership.

Recognition
In the 1976 New Year Honours, Dalziel was appointed a Commander of the Order of the British Empire, for services to education and literature. In 1981, the Department of English and Linguistics established an annual Margaret Dalziel Lecture in Dalziel's memory.

On her retirement, colleagues published a volume of essays in her honour: The Interpretive Power: Essays on Literature in Honour of Margaret Dalziel (University of Otago, 1980).

Publications
 Popular Fiction 100 Years Ago (1957), Cohen & West
 Myth and the Modern Imagination (1967), University of Otago Press
 ed., Charlotte Lennox, The Female Quixote, or, The Adventures of Arabella (1970), Oxford University Press
 Janet Frame (1980), Oxford University Press
 "Looking back" in Greg Waite, Jocelyn Harris, Heather Murray and John Hale (eds), World and stage: essays for Colin Gibson (1998), University of  Otago Department of English

References

1916 births
2003 deaths
20th-century New Zealand women writers
New Zealand Commanders of the Order of the British Empire
New Zealand women academics
Academic staff of the University of Otago
People from Rangiora
People educated at Rangiora High School
University of Canterbury alumni
Alumni of the University of Oxford